The Methodist Episcopal Church built in 1890 is an historic Methodist church located at Thoman and Union streets, in Crestline, Ohio. It was built by Bauer, Minich and Emmer in the Romanesque style. On October 27, 1978, it was added to the National Register of Historic Places. It is now the First United Methodist Church.

References

External links

 Google's cache of Crestline United Methodist Church history, Jun 6, 2008 06:34:25 GMT

Churches on the National Register of Historic Places in Ohio
Buildings and structures in Crawford County, Ohio
National Register of Historic Places in Crawford County, Ohio
United Methodist churches in Ohio